The Liga Espanola Baloncesto Oro (LEB Oro) Final Four MVP is an annual basketball award of the LEB Oro. It is awarded to the best player of the entire Finals series.

Winners

References

2